The 2019 European Diving Championships were held in Kyiv, Ukraine from 5 to 11 August 2019. This was the sixth edition of the stand-alone Championships, and the 40th European Championships in diving in total, including the diving portion of the European Aquatics Championships.

The event is a qualification event for the 2020 Summer Olympics with quota places awarded to the nation of the winners of both men's and women's 3 metre and 10 metre events.

Schedule
All times are local (UTC+03:00).

Participating nations
A total of 126 athletes (72 men and 54 women) from 23 LEN federations participated at the championships.

Medal table

Medal summary

Men

Women

Mixed

Championships Trophy
The trophy is assigned to the nation with most points gained by the top 12 athletes or teams in each event. Russia won the title with 258 points, while the previous Trophy's winner and host Ukraine finished at fourth place.

References

External links
Official website
Official LEN website

 
2019
Diving in Ukraine
2019
2019
European Diving Championships
European Diving Championships
August 2019 sports events in Ukraine
2010s in Kyiv
Diving Championships